Lovego Plaza is a shopping center located in Gangshan District, Kaohsiung, Taiwan. The mall started trial operations on 26 May 2022, and officially opened on 23 June 2022. It is the largest shopping mall in north Kaohsiung and the main core stores include Uniqlo, Muji, Nitori, Daiso and various themed restaurants, such as Kura Sushi. It is located in close proximity to Gangshan South metro station on the Red line of Kaohsiung Metro.

Gallery

See also
List of tourist attractions in Taiwan
Joy Plaza

References

External links

2022 establishments in Taiwan
Shopping malls established in 2022
Shopping malls in Kaohsiung